Fluting may refer to:

Fluting (architecture)
Fluting (firearms)
Fluting (geology)
Fluting (glacial)
Fluting (paper)

Arts, entertainment, and media
Fluting on the Hump

See also
Flute (disambiguation)